Higher Walton is a village in South Ribble, Lancashire, England. It is on the old road between Blackburn and Preston where it crosses the River Darwen. The road, at this point, is now part of the A675. Nearby places include Walton-le-Dale, Coupe Green, and Bamber Bridge.

The main road through the village has a number of shops, including a post office, a bicycle shop and takeaways. The village has two pubs - the Swan and the Mill Tavern. There is a church (All Saints, in the Blackburn diocese of the Church of England) and a primary school in the village.

The M6 motorway passes through the village, west of the centre, and crosses the River Darwen and A675 Higher Walton Road on a  -long bridge that was built as part of the Preston Bypass and opened in 1958.

The village was formerly called Moon's Mill, and developed around a cotton mill in the 19th century.

Governance 
Higher Walton is in the county of Lancashire. It is part of the district of South Ribble, which is a borough formed in 1974 after the reorganisation of local government in the Local Government Act 1972. It had been part of the township of Walton-le-Dale. In 1877, a local board was formed for the township, which in 1894 became Walton le Dale Urban District.

Famous residents
The contralto, Kathleen Ferrier (1912–1953) was born in the village.

See also

Listed buildings in Walton-le-Dale

References

External links

Villages in Lancashire
Geography of South Ribble